Ezequiel Zamora is one of the 13 municipalities of the state of Monagas, Venezuela. The municipality's capital is Punta de Mata.

History 
On 2021, Oscar Cedeño was elected Major.

Geography 
The Ezequiel Zamora municipality is northwest of Monagas State.

Economy 
The oil activity, in the areas of El Tejero and Muri.

Education 
The municipality has various schools and high schools, offering primary, secondary and diversified education.

Sports 

It also has sports fields and stadiums, as the Municipal Stadium "Los Evangélicos", located in Brisas del Aeropuerto de Punta de Mata.

Politics and government

Mayors 
 Ángel Guzmán (2008-2013)
 Raúl Brazon (2013-2017)
 Oscar Cedeño (2021-2025)

References

Municipalities of Monagas